Arzano is a comune (municipality) in the Metropolitan City of Naples in the Italian region Campania, located about 9 km north of Naples.

Arzano borders the following municipalities: Casandrino, Casavatore, Casoria, Frattamaggiore, Grumo Nevano, Naples.

Twin towns
 Arzano, France
 Cléguer, France

References

External links
Official website 

Cities and towns in Campania